Andrei Felix is a Filipino actor and television host.

Personal life

Felix formerly dated his Umagang Kay Ganda co-host Venus Raj.

Filmography

Television

Film

Awards and nominations

Notes

References

External links
 

Living people
Star Magic
21st-century Filipino male actors
Filipino television presenters
Year of birth missing (living people)